Vievee Elaure Francis is an American poet. She is an associate professor of English and Creative Writing at Dartmouth College. She earned an MFA from the University of Michigan in 2009, and she received a Rona Jaffe Award the same year. Vievee is the author of three collections of the poetry, the third of which, Forest Primeval, won the 2016 Hurston/Wright Legacy Award for poetry and the 2017 Kingsley Tufts (Kingsley and Kate Tufts Poetry Awards) poetry award.

Personal life
Francis is a native of Texas. She lived and worked for 15 years in Detroit, Michigan, where she was instrumental in fostering a literary community for youth, young-adult and adult poets. From there, she moved to Swannanoa, North Carolina while teaching at Warren Wilson College (undergraduate) and  North Carolina State University. From North Carolina State she went on to gain tenure at Dartmouth College in Hanover, New Hampshire. Francis is married to poet Matthew Olzmann, author of Mezzanines (Alice James Press) and Contradictions in the Design (Alice James Press), a native of Detroit.

Career
Francis is an associate professor in the department of English and Creative Writing at Dartmouth College, where she continues to write poetry. She is also an associate editor of Callaloo, A Premier Journal of African American and African Diaspora Arts & Letters. Prior to joining Dartmouth, she taught writing and poetry at North Carolina State University, among other colleges and universities.

Awards
In 2021, The Sewanee Review announced Francis as the recipient of the 2021 Aiken Taylor Award for Modern American Poetry.

Writing for the judging committee for the Kingsley and Kate Tufts Poetry Awards, Don Share, editor of Poetry magazine praised Forest Primeval as "an intense work, dark … Dantean … dreamlike in its visions.... Francis is reclaiming modernist and feminist legacies of poetry, and it takes great courage to do that."

References

Living people
Affrilachian Poets
African-American poets
American poets
Dartmouth College faculty
University of Michigan alumni
1963 births
21st-century African-American people
20th-century African-American people